Type 517 radar is believed to be an A-band/VHF air search radar widely deployed on PLAN surface vessels with 4 antennas in two crossed-brace supported pairs, one above the other, mounted in pairs on each side of a single tubular support carried on the turning gear.

Similar to the Russian P-8 'Dolphin'/KNIFE REST radar which China manufactures and deploys for the HQ-2 surface to air system complex, it is believed that Type 517 has similar capabilities and specifications. The system is manufactured by the Beijing Leiyin Electronic Technology Development Company (北京雷音电子技术开发有限公司).

Specifications
Technical Specification
 System Band: meter-band
 Beam width: 5° (H), 30° (V)
 Scan coverage: 360°×30°
 Range: 350 km against 4 m2 RCS target; 100 km against 0.1 m2 RCS Stealth aircraft
 Accuracy: range error ≤200m, angle error ≤1°
Processing capacity
Multiple tracking: ≥ 20 pcs
Antenna
 Antenna : Yagi-Uda array
 Rotation speed: 6 RPM
Transmitter / Receiver
Frequency: 180–210 MHz (meter-band)
NF: <6 dB
Power Supply
AC: 220VAC (150~250 VAC)
 Power consumption: 25 kW
Features
Non-coherent pulse compression (NCPC) system
Moving target automatically detection
Long range air surveillance
 Other reported names:
 Spider (export)
 SUR17B

External links
High Accuracy Air / Land Surveillance Radar System Of Long Range Detection
Beijing Leiyin Electronic Technology Development Co. 
SUR17B meter wave air warning radar 

Naval radars
Military radars of the People's Republic of China